William E. Dodge House, also known as Greyston Conference Center, is a historic home located in the Hudson Hill section of Riverdale in the Bronx in New York City.  It was built in 1863 and designed by architect James Renwick, Jr.  It is a -story masonry structure in the Gothic Revival style.  It was built for copper tycoon William E. Dodge, Jr. (1832–1903) as a summer residence and expanded in 1892 as a year-round suburban home.  It was formally dedicated on May 27, 1963, as the Greyston Conference Center, of Teachers College, Columbia University.

It was listed on the National Register of Historic Places in 1977.

See also
List of New York City Designated Landmarks in The Bronx
National Register of Historic Places in Bronx County, New York

References

Houses on the National Register of Historic Places in the Bronx
Gothic Revival architecture in New York (state)
Houses completed in 1863
History of the Bronx
Houses in the Bronx
New York City Designated Landmarks in the Bronx